The IEEE Electronics Packaging Award, formerly called the IEEE Components, Packaging, and Manufacturing Technologies Award, is a Technical Field Award established by the IEEE Board of Directors in 2002.  It is awarded for meritorious contribution to the advancement of components, electronic packaging or manufacturing technologies.

The award may be presented to an individual or a team of up to three recipients.

Recipients of this award receive a bronze medal, certificate and an honorarium.

Recipients 

Recipients of the award for each year include:

 2021: Chin C. Lee
 2020: Mitsumasa Koyanagi and Peter Ramm
 2019: Ephraim Suhir
 2018: William Chen
 2017: Paul S. Ho and King-Ning Tu
 2016: Michael Pecht
 2015: Nasser Borozorg-Grayeli
 2014: Avram Bar-Cohen 
 2013: John Lau 
 2012: Mauro Walker
 2011: Rao R. Tummala
 2010: Herbert Reichl
 2009:	George G. Harman

 2008:	Karl Puttlitz and Paul A. Totta
 2007: Dimitry Grabbe
 2006: C. P. Wong
 2005: Yutaka Tsukada
 2004: John W. Balde

References

External links 
 Information on the award at IEEE

Electronics Packaging Award
Awards established in 2002